Tucupita is the capital city of the Venezuelan state of Delta Amacuro.

Geography 
Delta Amacuro consists almost entirely of the swampy Orinoco River delta. Tucupita is hot and humid, and lies well into the delta on the Caño Manamo river (one of the two major branches of the Orinoco river delta). It is approached by a road which runs along the top of a  barrier constructed in the 1960s to create dry land. The project is considered by many to be a failure since little dry land was created and massive ecological disruption was caused by salt water penetration of the delta.

The delta is covered mostly by mangrove swamp but there is a huge range of other flora and fauna, making it one of the world's more ecologically diverse places. Significant amounts of oil have been discovered in the western parts of the delta and there is apprehension that exploitation of this oil will cause substantial ecological damage.

Religion 

Tucupita is the cathedral see of the Roman Catholic Apostolic Vicariate of Tucupita, with the Cathedral of the Divine Shepherdess.

Tourism 

The main income of Tucupita comes from eco-tourism. The attractions are the birds, mammals and reptiles of the delta, and the villages of the local Indians, the Warao. Tourists can visit the remote parts of the delta and stay in the stilted houses of the Warao in the delta itself.

There are bus connections to Bolivar City and other towns in the north of Venezuela, but in the delta itself only travel by boat is possible.

 
Cities in Delta Amacuro
Populated places established in 1848